is a railway station in the town of Tateyama, Toyama, Japan, operated by the private railway operator Toyama Chihō Railway.

Lines
It is also a station on the Toyama Chihō Railway Kamidaki Line, and is 12.2 kilometers from the terminus of that line at

Station layout 
The station has one ground-level side platform and one ground-level island platform serving four tracks. The station is staffed.

History
It was renamed to its present name on 20 August of the same year.

Adjacent stations

Passenger statistics
In fiscal 2015, the station was used by 402 passengers daily.

Surrounding area 
Tateyama Green Park Yoshimine

See also
 List of railway stations in Japan

References

External links

  

Railway stations in Toyama Prefecture
Railway stations in Japan opened in 1921
Stations of Toyama Chihō Railway
Tateyama, Toyama